The Cincinnati Reds are a Major League Baseball franchise based in Cincinnati. They play in the National League Central division. Also known in their early years as the "Cincinnati Red Stockings" (1882–1889) and "Cincinnati Redlegs" (1954–1959), pitchers for the Reds have thrown 17 no-hitters in franchise history. A no-hitter is officially recognized by Major League Baseball only "when a pitcher (or pitchers) allows no hits during the entire course of a game, which consists of at least nine innings", though one or more batters "may reach base via a walk, an error, a hit by pitch, a passed ball or wild pitch on strike three, or catcher's interference". No-hitters of less than nine complete innings were previously recognized by the league as official; however, several rule alterations in 1991 changed the rule to its current form. 

A perfect game is a no-hitter of an even higher order of magnitude. As defined by Major League Baseball, "in a perfect game, no batter reaches any base during the course of the game." Tom Browning is the only Reds pitcher to have throw a perfect game in team history. He accomplished the feat on September 16, 1988, against the Los Angeles Dodgers at Cincinnati's Riverfront Stadium. Fierce rivals of the Reds in the 1970s, the Dodgers nonetheless went on to win the World Series only six weeks after Browning's perfect game against them.

While Dick Burns of the Outlaw Reds hurled the first no-hitter in Cincinnati baseball history, Bumpus Jones threw the first no-hitter in Reds history on October 15, 1892. The most recent no-hitter was thrown by Wade Miley on May 7, 2021. Six left-handed starting pitchers have thrown no-hitters in franchise history and the other seven pitchers were right-handed. Eleven Reds no-hitters were thrown at home and only five on the road. They threw two in April, three in May, four in June, three in July, one in August, two in September, and one in October. The longest interval between no-hitters in franchise history was between the games pitched by Browning and Bailey, encompassing over 24 years. Conversely, the shortest interval between no-hitters was a mere four days, between the two consecutive no-hitters pitched by Johnny Vander Meer, on June 11 and June 15, 1938. The team against whom the Reds have thrown the most no-hit games (three) is the Atlanta Braves (formerly "Boston Braves"), who were defeated by Vander Meer (first no-hitter in 1938), Clyde Shoun (in 1944), and Ewell Blackwell (in 1947). There are two no-hitters which the team allowed at least a run. The most baserunners allowed in a no-hitter was by Jim Maloney (in 1965), who allowed 11. Of the 16 no-hitters, the largest margin of victory in a Reds no-hitter was an 11–0 win by Ted Breitenstein in 1898. The smallest and most common margin of victory was 1–0, in wins by Fred Toney (1917), Shoun (1944), Maloney (1965), Browning (1988), and Bailey (2012).

The umpire is also an integral part of any no-hitter. The task of the umpire in a baseball game is to make any decision "which involves judgment, such as, but not limited to, whether a batted Ball is fair or foul, whether a pitch is a strike or a Ball, or whether a runner is safe or out… [the umpire's judgment on such matters] is final." Part of the duties of the umpire making calls at home plate includes defining the strike zone, which "is defined as that area over homeplate  the upper limit of which is a horizontal line at the midpoint between the top of the shoulders and the top of the uniform pants, and the lower level is a line at the hollow beneath the kneecap." These calls define every baseball game and are therefore integral to the completion of any no-hitter. 14 different umpires presided over each of the Reds' 16 no-hitters.

The manager is another integral part of any no-hitter. The tasks of the manager is to determine the starting rotation as well as batting order and defensive lineup every game. Managers choosing the right pitcher and right defensive lineup at a right game at a right place at a right time would lead to a no-hitter. 12 different managers have led to the Reds' 16 no-hitters.

List of no-hitters in Reds history

See also
List of Major League Baseball no-hitters

References

No-hitters
Cincinnati Reds